is a Buddhist temple in the Iwane neighborhood of the city of  Konan, Shiga Prefecture, Japan. It belongs to the Tendai school of Japanese Buddhism. Its main image is a hibutsu statue of Yakushi Nyōrai, which was carved in 993. Its Hondō is a National Treasure.

History
The history of Zensui-ji is uncertain, as the documentary evidence of its foundation has been lost. The temple's legend states that it was founded by Empress Genmei during the Wado era (708-715), and that the tempe was originally called "Wado-ji". During the early Heian period, Saichō came to the temple to pray for rain, and converted it to the Tendai sect. Later, when Emperor Kanmu fell ill, Saichō sent water from a spring at this temple, and the emperor made a miraculous recovery. The emperor bestowed the name of "Zensui-ji" on the temple in commemoration of this event. At its peak, the temple grew to have 26 subsidiary temples, which occupied both mountains adjacent to the main temple.

The temple is 3.9 kilometers, or approximately a one hour walk, from Mikumo Station on the JR West Kusatsu Line.

Cultural Properties
The Main Hall (Hondō) of Zensui-ji was built in the Nanboku-chō period and was completed in either 1364 or 1366. It is in the irimoya-zukuri-style and is a seven by five bay building with a hinoki cypress bark shingled roof.  The building was designated a National Treasure in 1954.

The temple also has many statues which are  National Important Cultural Properties:
 Yakushi Nyōrai, Heian period (the honzon of the temple) 
 Bonten and Taishaku-ten
 Bishamonten, Heian period 
 Jikokuten and  Zōjōten, Kamakura period  
 Shi-Tennō, Heian period 
 Fudō-Myōō, Heian period
Monjū Bosatsu in the form of a Buddhist priest, Heian period 
Niō, Heian period
 Shaka Nyōrai, in gold and bronze, depicted as an infant. Nara period. This statue is known to have existed in 762 AD when it was used during a Buddha's Birthday ceremony at Ishiyama-dera and is believed to have been made at the casting workshops at Tōdai-ji.

See also
List of National Treasures of Japan (temples)

References

External links

 Shikoku 49 Yakushi pilgrimage website 
 Shiga-Biwako Visitor's Guide 

Buddhist temples in Shiga Prefecture
Tendai temples
Konan, Shiga
 Ōmi Province
7th-century Buddhist temples
National Treasures of Japan
Buddhism in the Nara period